T. Raghumurthy (born 10 June 1963) is a politician from the state of Karnataka. He is a member of Indian National Congress. He won as MLA from  Challakere Assembly constituency 2018.

Positions held
 2013: Elected to Karnataka Legislative Assembly.
 2018: Re-elected to Karnataka Legislative Assembly.

References 

Living people
1963 births
Indian National Congress politicians from Karnataka
People from Karnataka
People from Chitradurga district
Karnataka MLAs 2013–2018
Karnataka MLAs 2018–2023